Acraea ducarmei is a butterfly in the family Nymphalidae. It is found in the Democratic Republic of the Congo (Kivu and Biakato).See Pierre & Bernaud, 2014  for taxonomy.

References

External links

 Images representing Acraea ducarmei at Bold

ducarmei
Butterflies described in 2012